Pulak Bandyopadhyay (2 May 1931 – 7 September 1999) was a Bengali Indian lyricist and songwriter of Bengali cinema.

Early life
He was born and brought up in Salkia, Howrah. His family had close links with art circles, in particular in drama, literature, and music.  He was a graduate of the Scottish Church College, in Calcutta.

Career
He experimented with various genres and in the process contributed richly to the evolution of musical compositions in Bengali cinema during the 1960s and 1970s. The sheer spontaneity of his compositions made him a much sought after lyricist. Famous Bengali and Bollywood artistes like Akhilbandhu Ghosh, Hemanta Mukherjee, Manna Dey, Geeta Dutt, Lata Mangeshkar, Asha Bhonsle, Haimanti Shukla, Shyamal Mitra, Bhupen Hazarika, Pratima Bandopadhyay, Utpala Sen, Arundhati Holme Chowdhury, Satinath Mukherjee, Madhuri Chattopadhyay, Anup Ghoshal and Arati Mukherjee sang his compositions. In 1966 film Sankhabela, he wrote two evergreen songs- "Ke Prothom Kachhe Esechhi" (Lata Mageshkar and Manna Dey) and "Aaj Mon Cheyechhe" (Lata Mangeshkar). In 1969 film Prothom Kadam Phool, he wrote "Ami Shri Shri Bhojo Hori Manna".
In 1972 film Basanta Bilap, he wrote "O Shyam Jokhon Tokhon, Khelo Na Khela Emon".

Death
On 7 September 1999, he committed suicide by jumping off a launch into the Hooghly river.

Notable songs
 "Ke Jaane Ka Ghanta"
 "Bristi Bristi Bristi"
 "Tomar Daake Sara dite"
 "Ja Re Ja Ure Rajar Kumar"
 "Jani Na Kakhon Tumi"
 "Jakhon Keu Amake Pagol Bole"
 "Ami Agantuk"
 "Ami Gaan Shonabo Ekti Asha"
 "Ke Prothom Kache Esechi"
 "Jato Bhabna Chilo"
 "Khopar Oi Golap Diye"
 "Ei Chhanda E Ananda"
 "Amar Bhalobasar Rajprasade"
 "Tumi Shatodal Hoye Phute"
 "Tapur Tupur Bristi Jhore"
 "Phuleshwari"
 "Jeo Na Darao Bondhu"
Doore doore kachhe kachhe
Ami sri sri Bhojohori Manna
Agoon legechhe
Dau dau dau jole duranto bonhi
Lajboti nupurer rini jhini jhini
Kotodin pore ele, ektu bosho
Shedin tomay dekhechhilam
Ogo kajol noyona horini
Shei to abar kachhe ele
O Lolita, oke aaj chole jete bolna
Jani tomar premer jogyo ami to noi
Abar hobe to dekha
Dorodi go
Kothay kothai je raat hoye jai
Amar bolar kichhu chhilona
Aaj mon cheyechhe
Dweep jwele oi tara
Ami tomar kachhei phire ashbo
Sobuj Pahar dake
Esho pran bhorono doinyo horono he
Tomay keno laagchhe eto chena
Meghla bhanga rod uthechhe
Tomar du chokhe amar swapno aanka
Boro saadh jaage ekbar tomai dekhi
Tumi onek jotno kore amay dukkho dite cheyechho
 " Basrai Golap Haate Dilam"
 " Tomar Bhubane Phuler Mela Ami Kadi Sharaye"

References

External links
 
 Pulak Bandyopadhyay
Pulak Bandyopadhyay remembers Geeta Dutt
Pulak Bandyopadhyay on Bhupen Hazarika
Some songs

Indian male singer-songwriters
Indian singer-songwriters
Singers from Kolkata
Bengali singers
Scottish Church College alumni
1931 births
1999 deaths
20th-century Indian poets
20th-century Indian singers
20th-century Indian male writers
20th-century Indian male singers
Suicides by drowning
Suicides in India